Siltala is a Finnish surname. Notable people with the surname include:

  (born 1957), Finnish historian
 Mike Siltala (born 1963), Canadian ice hockey player
 Antti Siltala (born 1984), Finnish volleyball player

Finnish-language surnames